"She's Mine" is a song by George Jones.  It was composed by Jones and Jack Ripley.

Background
The song seemingly describes the feelings of a man towards a woman, presumably his wife, who no longer loves him, but he feels "satisfied just having her around."  As the song concludes, however, it has a surprise ending.

Chart performance
Jones had already cut it for United Artists earlier in the decade but a new version was released as a single in 1969 on the Musicor label and rose to #6 on the Billboard country singles chart.  It became yet another Top 10 hit for Jones, who had been a constant presence on the country charts throughout most of the decade.

Charts

References

1970 songs
George Jones songs
Songs written by George Jones
Musicor Records singles
Song recordings produced by Pappy Daily